Aulacigastridae is a very small family of flies known as sap flies. The family Stenomicridae used to be included within this family, but was moved by Papp in 1984. They are found in all the Ecoregions.

Description
For terms see Morphology of Diptera.

Aulacigastrids are small black flies. The head is rounded. Postvertical bristles and ocellar bristles are absent, there are two orbital bristles on each side of frons, the anterior orbital bristle directed forward and towards median line. Vibrissae are well developed. On the mesonotum there are two pairs of dorsocentral bristles. The costa is interrupted near the subcosta (which reaches the costa). The posterior basal wing cell and discoidal wing cell are fused and the anal vein does not reach the  margin of the wings.

Biology
The larvae of sap flies feed on the sap of deciduous and coniferous trees (sap runs) and feed on micro-organisms within the sap. Adults feed on nectar, and other fermenting substances.

Species lists
 West Palaearctic including Russia
Nearctic
 Australasian/Oceanian
Japan
World list

Identification
Duda. 1934. Aulacigastridae. In Lindner, In: Lindner, E. (Ed.). Die Fliegen der Paläarktischen Region  6,1,58c, 1-5. Keys to Palaearctic species but now needs revision (in German).
Stackelberg, A.A. Family Aulacigastridae in  Bei-Bienko, G. Ya, 1988 Keys to the insects of the European Part of the USSR Volume 5 (Diptera) Part 2 English edition. Keys to Palaearctic species but now needs revision.

Phylogeny

References

Mathis, W. N., Freidberg, A. A, 1994 Revision of the Nearctic Aulacigaster Macquart with notes on A. leucopeza (Meigen) from the Palearctic Region (Diptera, Aulacigastridae) Proceedings of the Entomological Society of Washington 96 :583–598 online

External links
Diptera.info Images

Brachycera families
Opomyzoidea